John Joseph Dudra (May 27, 1916 – October 25, 1965) was a Major League Baseball infielder who played for the Boston Braves in 1941.

Dudra put up some impressive numbers during his short time in the big leagues.  In his fourteen games (September 7-September 25) he played all four infield positions and went 9-for-25, a .360 batting average.  He hit three doubles, one triple, scored three runs, and had three runs batted in.  His on-base percentage was .429, and his slugging percentage was .560.

On defense, he had 20 putouts, 13 assists, and 1 error, giving him a fielding percentage of .971.  He also took part in 5 double plays.

Dudra served in the US Army during World War II, and died from diabetes at the age of 49 in Pana, Illinois.

Trivia
Dudra was born in the same week as Braves second baseman Frank Drews. (May 21–27, 1916)

References

External links 
Baseball Reference
Retrosheet

Major League Baseball infielders
Baseball players from Illinois
Boston Braves players
1916 births
1965 deaths
Major League Baseball second basemen
Major League Baseball third basemen
People from Assumption, Illinois